Podromanija is a village in the municipality of Sokolac, Republika Srpska, Bosnia and Herzegovina.

Geography
The village, named "below the Romanija", is located within the Romanija geographical region.

History
In 1991 the area was incorporated into the SAO Romanija, a Serb-established autonomous province, which later merged with other SAOs to form Republika Srpska in 1992.

Demographic history
According to the 1991 census, the village had 377 inhabitants, of whom 360 were Serbs (95,49%), 12 Muslims (3,18%), and others. The "local community", or mjesna zajednica (MZ) of Podromanija had 560 inhabitants, out of whom 539 were Serbs (96,25%), 15 Muslims (2,68%), and others.

References

Populated places in Sokolac
Glasinac plateau